The 1992 CA-TennisTrophy was a men's tennis tournament played on indoor carpet courts at the Wiener Stadthalle in Vienna in Austria and was part of the World Series of the 1992 ATP Tour. It was the 18th edition of the tournament and took place from 19 October until 26 October 1992. First-seeded Petr Korda won the singles title.

Finals

Singles

 Petr Korda defeated  Gianluca Pozzi 6–3, 6–2, 5–7, 6–1
 It was Korda's 3rd title of the year and the 11th of his career.

Doubles

 Ronnie Båthman /  Anders Järryd defeated  Kent Kinnear /  Udo Riglewski 6–3, 7–5
 It was Båthman's only title of the year and the 3rd of his career. It was Järryd's 3rd title of the year and the 58th of his career.

References

External links
 ATP tournament profile
 ITF tournament edition details

 
CA-TennisTrophy
Vienna Open